2019 South American Championships in Athletics was the 51st edition of the biennial athletics competition between South American nations. The event was held in Lima, Peru, from 24 to 26 May at the Villa Deportiva Nacional.

Medal summary

Men

Women

Medal table

Points table

Participation
All 13 member federations of CONSUDATLE participated at the championships.

See also
2019 South American U20 Championships in Athletics
Athletics at the 2019 Pan American Games
2019 World Championships in Athletics

References

External links

Official site 
Full results

South American Championships in Athletics
International athletics competitions hosted by Peru
Sports competitions in Lima
South American Championships in Athletics
South American Championships in Athletics
Athletics Championships
South American Championships in Athletics